Carpiscula galearis is a species of sea snail, a marine gastropod mollusk in the family Ovulidae, the ovulids, cowry allies or false cowries.

References

Ovulidae
Gastropods described in 1973